Carex polymorpha common names variable sedge and many forms sedge, is a perennial species of Carex native to North America.

Conservation status in the United States
It is listed as endangered in Connecticut, Maine, Massachusetts, New Jersey, Rhode Island, and Virginia. It is listed as 
endangered and extirpated in Maryland, and as threatened in New Hampshire and Pennsylvania.

References

polymorpha